Henry Berry Slack (March 31, 1877 in Chicago, Illinois – July 18, 1928 in San Francisco, California) was an American track and field athlete who competed at the 1900 Summer Olympics in Paris, France.

Slack competed in the 100 metres event, placing third in his quarterfinal heat to be eliminated in the first round.  He was similarly eliminated in the first round (this time, the semifinals) of the 400 metres.

References

External links

 De Wael, Herman. Herman's Full Olympians: "Athletics 1900". Accessed 18 March 2006.
 
 

Athletes (track and field) at the 1900 Summer Olympics
Olympic track and field athletes of the United States
American male sprinters
Track and field athletes from Chicago
1877 births
1928 deaths
Chicago Maroons men's track and field athletes